Amputee football in Turkey started in 2003, the first nation-wide competition was held in 2004, and the first international participation  took place the same year. The sport is governed by the Turkish Physically Disabled Sports Federation ("Türkiye Bedensel Engelliler Spor Federasyonu", TBESF), and supported by the Turkish Football Federation ("Türkiye Futbol Federasyonu", TFF).

History 
Created in 1982, amputee football was developed for athletes having a physical impairment with unilateral lower and upper limb amputation. The disabled sport became international in 1985.

Amputee football started in Turkey for rehabilitation purposes within the Turkish Armed Forces in 2003, and attracted later scientific research by the Sports Medicine discipline in Turkey.

Domestic 
In May 2003, the "Karagücü Amputee Football" team, supported by the Turkish Land Forces ("Türk Kara Kuvvetleri") were founded, and started activities in accordance with the rules of the World Amputee Football Federation (WAFF). Amputee football was played in the beginning at regional level. Necessary applications were made to the Turkish Physically  Disabled Sports Federation (TBESF) for the recognition of this sport in Turkey, for the establishment of a league, and for including amputee football in the 2004 activity program of the TBESF. Amputee football was included into the TBESF as the 12th branch in 2004.

The first nation-wide competition was the "Ghazi Tournament" (in honor of "Ghazi Mustafa Kemal, founder of the Turkish Republic) held in 2004. The first Turkish Amputee Football Championship was held in Trabzon with seven registered teams on 4–12 March 2007.

Preliminary preparations for the establishment of a league were made in 2008 by organizing a competition, at which eleven teams participated. Competition instructions and referee guidelines were worked our by the Central Referee Committee. In August 2009 , the Amputee Football League was established in Turkey. The TBESF governs the ampute football leagues "Super League",  "First League" and "Second League" as well as the" Turkey Cup". which are supported by the Turkish Football Federation (TFF).  In the 2021–22 season, a total of 34 clubs from 19 cities  all over the country competed in three leagues.

Turkish Amputee Football Super League 
Turkish Amputee Football Super League is the top-level league in Turkey. In the 2021–22 season, the Super League was played by following 14 clubs:

Turkish Amputee Football First League 
The Turkish AMputee Football First League is the second-level league of the amputee football in Turkey. In the 2021-22 seaspn, it consisted of following 9 clubs:

Turkish Amputee Football Second League 
The Turkish AMputee Football Second League is the third-level league in Turkey. In the 2021–22 season, following 11 clubs competed in the league.:

International 
The Turkey national team competed for the first time at the European-level Amputee Football  Championship of 2004 held in Kyiv, Ukraine on 27 May-2 June, and became runners-up.

On 3–8 July 2005, the national team played two friendly matches in London, England to gain experience for the upcoming World Championship. Turkey's world-level debut was at the 2005 World Championship in Rio de Janeiro, Brazil on 11–21 August, where they placed fifth. For preparations to the next World Championship, the national team held a joint training camp in Ankara with the England team in May 2007, and played two friendly matches. The first medal for Turkey came in bronze at the 2007 World Championship hosted by Turkey in Antalya on 11–21 November. Three more consecutive bronze medals followed in 2010 Crespo, 2012 Kaliningrad and 2014 Culiacán. The silver medal was won at the 2018 Guadalajara. Finally, the national team became world champions at the 2022 World Cup in Istanbul defeating the defending-champion Angola by 4–1.

Organized by the TBESF and TFF, Turkey hosted the European-level Amputee Football Championship in Antalya on 1–6 December 2008. The Turkey team took the silver medal losing to Russia 2–0 in the last match. In February 2015, Turkey was among the founding member countries of the European Amputee Football Federation (EAFF). The first official issue of the European championship organized by the EAFF took place in 2017 held in Istanbul. Turkey won the champion title defeating England 2–1 in the final. Turkey won a second European gold medal in Kraków, Poland in 2021 beating Spain 5–0 in the final.

References 

 
Amputee football by country
Parasports in Turkey